Pittosporum turneri, commonly called Turner's kohuhu or the tent pole tree, is a species of plant in the Pittosporaceae family. It is endemic to New Zealand. P. turneri was first described by Donald Petrie in 1925. The species flowers between the months of October to December. P. turneri is threatened by possums. It is regarded as being Nationally Vulnerable.

References

turneri
Endemic flora of New Zealand
Conservation dependent plants
Near threatened biota of Oceania
Taxonomy articles created by Polbot